Galina Alekseyeva may refer to:

 Galina Kreft (1950–2005), later Galina Kreft-Alekseyeva, Soviet sprint canoer
 Galina Alekseyeva (diver) (born 1946), Russian former diver